New Sacred Cow is the debut studio album by Kenna, released on June 10, 2003 by Columbia Records. The album was produced by Chad Hugo of The Neptunes and Kenna. Kenna created something of an underground buzz with the release of his first single "Hell Bent" in 2001. The album was leaked to the internet over a year before its final release, as it was delayed by record company politics. "Freetime" was chosen as the single to lead off the release of the album. A video was shot, and appeared sporadically on MTV2 along with the video for "Hell Bent". "Freetime" peaked at #19 on the Billboard Hot Dance Club Play charts. In late 2004, "Sunday After You" was remixed by Chad Hugo and released as a single. The single version differs greatly from the album version.

Track listing

Release and reception

On the CD, "Vexed and Glorious" and "A Better Control" are placed on the same track, as a hidden interlude.
Tracks 8, 9, and 13 were produced by Kenna alone, and all others were with Chad Hugo.

Promo copies of "New Sacred Cow" surfaced over a year before the album's release, with a slightly different track order. The song "Siren" didn't appear until the official release of the album.

A music video to the stop motion short film More to the song of "Hell Bent" was aired on MTV2 in 2001, and the Toonami Midnight Run. It was created and directed by one of the future directors of Kung Fu Panda, Mark Osbourne.

"Freetime" was used in the TV show CSI.

Personnel 

 Kenna – Keyboards, Vocals, Writing, Producer, Logos And Illustration 
 Chad Hugo – Keyboard, Saxophone, Writing (tracks: 1–7, 10–12)
 Chad Hugo (as Chase Chad) – Producer (tracks: 1–7, 10–12)
 David Davidson – Strings
 Ethan Johns – Bass (New Scared Cow)
 John Haynes – Engineer
 Matt Pinfield – A&R
 Otto Price – Bass (Red Man, War In Me)
 Pui Tse – Logos and Illustration
 Sean Murphy – Photography
 Serban Ghenea – Engineer, Mixing

References 

2003 debut albums
Albums produced by Chad Hugo
Albums produced by Kenna
Columbia Records albums
Kenna albums